Haemophilus paraphrophilus is a species of Haemophilus.

References

paraphrophilus